SEL: Studies in English Literature 1500–1900 is an academic journal founded in 1956. It publishes articles concerning four categories of British literature from 1500–1900—English Renaissance, Tudor and Stuart drama, Restoration and 18th Century, and 19th century. Each issue focuses on one of these four areas of concern along with an omnibus review of recent studies. Its executive editor is Logan D. Browning of Rice University.

The journal is published quarterly in February, May, August, and November by the Johns Hopkins University Press, available on Project Muse. The average length of an issue is 224 pages.

External links
Official website
 SEL on the JHU Press website
 SEL  at Project MUSE

Literary magazines published in the United States
British literature
Publications established in 1956
Johns Hopkins University Press academic journals
Quarterly journals
English-language journals